New Century Plaza is a tower complex located in Nanjing, China. Tower A, the main building, is a 255.2 meter (837 foot) tall skyscraper.

Transportation
The building is accessible from Daxinggong Station of Nanjing Metro.

See also
 List of skyscrapers

External links 
 Emporis.com - Building ID 134089
 SkyscraperPage.com's entry

Skyscraper office buildings in Nanjing